Tropical Storm Bebinca, known in the Philippines as Tropical Depression Fabian, was a weak tropical cyclone that brought minor damage in China and Vietnam, causing a death and an economic loss of about US$13 million.

Meteorological history

In mid-June, strong but disorganized convection persisted in the South China Sea approximately 1,110 km (690 mi) south of Hong Kong. The disturbance gradually organized, and was classified as a tropical depression by the Japan Meteorological Agency (JMA) at 1800 UTC on June 19; The Philippine Atmospheric, Geophysical and Astronomical Services Administration (PAGASA) followed suit six hours later, naming the system Fabian. Despite wind shear generated by a subtropical ridge, the depression maintained a well-defined circulation, allowing the system to intensify. At 0000 UTC on June 21, the JMA upgraded the cyclone to Tropical Storm Bebinca. Following this upgrade in strength, however, Bebinca leveled out in intensity prior to making landfall on Hainan on June 22. Bebinca's passage weakened the system to tropical depression strength, and, despite moving over the Gulf of Tonkin, failed to restrengthen before making its final landfall on June 23 east of Hanoi.

Impact

Hainan

Sanya Phoenix International Airport cancelled 110 flights and delayed another 37, affecting and stranding 8 thousand passengers. In Beibu Bay, a fishing boat with four fishermen on board became unable to contact land, but were found the subsequent day. A total of 21.7 million people were affected, and damage amounted to ¥10 million (US$1.63 million).

Vietnam
Several provinces in Northern Vietnam experienced heavy rainfall due to the passage of Bebinca. Economic losses of VND 1.19 trillion (US$56.5 million) were recorded. Floods in Nghệ An Province killed one person; two others went missing.

See also

Tropical Storm Jebi (2013)
Tropical Storm Kujira (2015)
Tropical Storm Dianmu (2016)

References

External links

JMA General Information of Tropical Storm Bebinca (1305) from Digital Typhoon
JMA Best Track Data of Tropical Storm Bebinca (1305) 
JTWC Best Track Data of Tropical Storm 05W (Bebinca)
05W.BEBINCA from the U.S. Naval Research Laboratory

2013 Pacific typhoon season
2013 disasters in China
2013 disasters in the Philippines
Typhoons in the Philippines
Typhoons in China
Typhoons in Vietnam
2013 in Vietnam
Western Pacific tropical storms
Bebinca